is a Japanese anime television series produced by Zuiyo and animated by Shaft. It was originally broadcast on Fuji TV for 23 episodes between October 5, 1984, and January 1, 1985.

Plot 
Joulupukki Family lives along with the tonttu and wights in a forest in Finland. They experience a lot of adventures along with the other residents of the forest. For example, they pack Christmas presents together.

English dub
In 1991, episodes were edited together into two short movies called A Christmas Adventure and Christmas Reindeer Tales by Saban Entertainment.

Characters
 Patty (Elisa) - Santa Claus's granddaughter.
 Erkki
 Santa Claus (Joulupukki)
 Mauri
 Mrs. Claus (Muori)
 Elmi
 Pertti
 Kaarina
 Viktori
 Lasse

Voice cast
Hiromi Tsuru as Elisa
Hirotaka Suzuoki as Erkki
Kōsei Tomita as Joulupukki
Mayumi Tanaka as Mauri
Miyoko Asō as Muori
Rihoko Yoshida as Elmi
Yuri Nashiwa as the narrator
Yuu Shimaka as Pertti
Hitomi Oikawa as Kaarina
Naoki Tatsuta as Viktori
Ryō Horikawa as Lasse
Eken Mine
Hiroshi Masuoka
Ikuya Sawaki
Mitsuo Senda
Yoshiko Sakakibara

English dub
Mike Reynolds as Santa Claus
Barbara Goodson as Mrs. Claus, Polly
Rebecca Forstadt as Patty
Lara Cody as Marty
Heidi Lenhart as Monica
Tifanie Christun as Bridget
Robert V. Barron as Joseph
Barry Stigler as Bert
Jeff Winkless as Jeb, Elf
Tom Wyner as Henry
Bill Capizzi as Elf
Steve Kramer as Elf
Kerrigan Mahan as Elf
Ron Salaises
Wendy Iwai
Yaba Greenfield
B.J. Sharp

See also
 List of Christmas films
 Santa Claus in film

References

External links
 
 
 

1984 anime television series debuts
Japanese children's animated adventure television series
Japanese children's animated fantasy television series
Fuji TV original programming
Fictional elves
Christmas television series